The Boys of Number Fifty Seven (Swedish: Grabbarna i 57:an) is a 1935 Swedish comedy film directed by Ivar Johansson and starring Julia Cæsar, Britta Brunius and Tord Bernheim. It focuses on the various residents of a boarding house in the Södermalm district of Stockholm.

Cast
 Julia Cæsar as Sofia Dahlberg
 Britta Brunius as 	Lisa Dahlberg
 Tord Bernheim as 	Gösta
 Sten Lindgren as 	Karl-Göran Dahlberg
 Disa Gillis as 	Greta
 Emy Hagman as 	Vivan
 Sven-Olof Sandberg as 	Svenne
 Elof Ahrle as Fabian Karlsson
 Alf Östlund as 	Vicke Vallin
 Siegfried Fischer as 	Oscar Dahlberg
 Ludde Juberg as 	Blomkvist
 Arthur Fischer as Mellgren
 Artur Cederborgh as 	Police inspector Bergström
 Bror Berger as 	Hoodlum 
 Gösta Bodin as 	Police inspector 
 Tyra Dörum as 	Aunt Malvina 
 Bertil Ehrenmark as 	Häng-Lasse
 Wictor Hagman as 	Hoodlum 
 Nils Hallberg as 	Kalle 
 Carl Harald as 	Hoodlum 
 Erik Johansson as 	Inspector Lundberg 
 Holger Löwenadler as 	Hoodlum's leader 
 Otto Malmberg as 	Hoodlum 
 Harry Persson as 'Lasse Sledgehammer' - Hoodlum 
 Robert Ryberg as 	Hoodlum

References

Bibliography 
 Larsson, Mariah & Marklund, Anders. Swedish Film: An Introduction and Reader. Nordic Academic Press, 2010.
 Qvist, Per Olov & von Bagh, Peter. Guide to the Cinema of Sweden and Finland. Greenwood Publishing Group, 2000.

External links 
 

1935 films
Swedish comedy films
1935 comedy films
1930s Swedish-language films
Films directed by Ivar Johansson
Swedish black-and-white films
Films set in Stockholm
Films shot in Stockholm
1930s Swedish films